Juan Francisco Uribe Ronquillo (born 11 January 1966) is a Mexican former footballer who played as a striker. He spent his entire career in Mexico, except for one year in the United States' Major League Soccer.

References

1966 births
Living people
Mexican footballers
Club Universidad Nacional footballers
Coyotes Neza footballers
Atlético Potosino footballers
Atlante F.C. footballers
Club León footballers
Club América footballers
Tigres UANL footballers
C.D. Veracruz footballers
San Jose Earthquakes players
Club Puebla players
Association football forwards
Mexican expatriate footballers
Expatriate soccer players in the United States
Mexican expatriate sportspeople in the United States
Major League Soccer players
Mexico international footballers
People from Tehuacán